Elections to the French National Assembly were held in French Dahomey and French Togoland on 21 October 1945. The territory elected two seats to the Assembly via two electoral colleges. French missionary Francis Aupiais of the Popular Republican Movement was elected from the first college and Sourou-Migan Apithy in the second, but Aupiais died before taking office.

Background
Some residents of French Togoland opposed attempts to entrench French rule by allowing elections to the French National Assembly in what was a League of Nations mandate rather than a French colony. Petitions against French policy were sent to the United Nations by the Ewe, who sought to be reunited with their brethren in British Togoland.

Campaign
Despite having left Dahomey seventeen years before the elections, Aupiais remained a popular figure in Dahomey, even amongst animists. His former pupil Sourou-Migan Apithy benefitted from his association with Aupiais, although he had also become an important figure in his own right through his work on the Monnerville Commission, which had reported on the future of the French colonies.

Results

First College

Second College

Aftermath
Following the elections, Senegalese MP Lamine Guèye attempted to persuade all the African MPs to form an African Bloc, which would be affiliated with the SFIO. Although the attempt failed, Apithy did sit with the SFIO.

References

Dahomey
Elections in Benin
1945 in French Dahomey
Elections in Togo
1945 in French Togoland
Legislative elections in France
Dahomey
October 1945 events in Africa